Martina Navratilova was the defending champion but was beaten in the quarterfinals by Meredith McGrath, 6–7, 6–2, 6–4.

McGrath won in the final 6–2, 6–4 against Linda Harvey-Wild.

Seeds
A champion seed is indicated in bold text while text in italics indicates the round in which that seed was eliminated. The top eight seeds received a bye to the second round.

  Martina Navratilova (quarterfinals)
 n/a
  Kimiko Date (second round)
  Natalia Zvereva (semifinals)
  Helena Suková (third round)
  Sabine Appelmans (second round)
  Lori McNeil (third round)
  Nathalie Tauziat (third round)
  Amy Frazier (first round)
  Naoko Sawamatsu (second round)
  Inés Gorrochategui (third round)
  Brenda Schultz (first round)
  Chanda Rubin (first round)
  Natalia Medvedeva (first round)
  Patty Fendick (third round)
  Ginger Helgeson-Nielsen (first round)

Draw

Finals

Top half

Section 1

Section 2

Bottom half

Section 3

Section 4

References
 1994 Volkswagen Cup Draw

Eastbourne International
1994 WTA Tour